Nidavanda is a village in the southern state of Karnataka, India. It is located in the Nelamangala taluk of Bangalore Rural district.

Demographics 
Nidavanda had population of 1,540 of which 799 are males while 741 are females as per report released by Census India 2011.

Geography 
The total geographical area of village is 450.22 hectares.

Bus Route from Bengaluru City 
Yeshwantapura - Nelamangala

See also 

 Karimanne 
 Bengaluru Rural District

References

External links 

Villages in Bangalore Rural district